Ridding is a surname, and may refer to:

 Charles Ridding (1825–1905), English cricketer
 C. M. Ridding (1862–1941), English scholar of Sanskrit and Pali
 Ernest Ridding 1927–2001), Australian eccentric 
 Bill Ridding (1911–1981), English football player and manager
 George Ridding (1828–1904), English headmaster and bishop
 Laura Ridding (1849–1939), British biographer, suffragist and philanthropist
 William Ridding (cricketer) (1830–1900), English cricketer

See also
 Riddings, village in Derbyshire, England.